is a Japanese composer and conductor.  A native of Tokyo, he was a pupil of Kan'ichi Shimofusa; he studied conducting with Kurt Wöss and Wilhelm Loibner and, like them, later became a conductor of the NHK Symphony Orchestra.  As a conductor he has served with numerous orchestras throughout Japan; as a composer his prime influences are Béla Bartók and Dmitri Shostakovich. Rostropovich performed the world premiere of the composer's six-movement 1967 First Cello Concerto, a piece described by Gramophone as "attractive", with the additional comment that it "sounds like Japanese folk music rendered orchestral by Kodaly". His best-known work is a Rhapsody for Orchestra based on Japanese folk songs.

Toyama won the Suntory Music Award in 1982.

References

Biography at Naxos.com

1931 births
20th-century classical composers
20th-century conductors (music)
20th-century Japanese composers
20th-century Japanese male musicians
21st-century classical composers
21st-century conductors (music)
21st-century Japanese composers
21st-century Japanese male musicians
Concert band composers
Japanese classical composers
Japanese conductors (music)
Japanese male classical composers
Living people
Musicians from Tokyo